Grenadians in the United Kingdom are citizens or residents of the United Kingdom whose ethnic origins lie fully or partially in Grenada. 9,783 Grenadian-born people were recorded by the 2001 UK Census.

Migration from Grenada to the UK

Migration has included that of the Windrush Generation; many of the Grenadians who left home as part of this movement settled in Yorkshire.

People

The following is an incomplete list of notable UK residents of Grenadian heritage:
Hamza Choudhury, footballer.
Joan Anim-Addo, academic, writer and publisher.
James Baillie, slave owner and merchant.
Allister Bain, actor and playwright.
Jean Buffong, writer.
Craig David, singer-songwriter.
Daniel Dubois, heavyweight boxer.
Jourdan Dunn, model also of Afro-Jamaican and Syrian descent.
Rhodan Gordon, community activist.
Lewis Hamilton, racecar driver.
George Harris, actor.
Reece James, footballer.
Lauren James, footballer.
Roger Michael, impresario in London.
Sam Morris, activist.
PW, rapper.
Tyler Roberts, footballer.
Arthur Wharton, first black professional footballer in the UK.
Verna Wilkins, publisher and author.

See also 
 Black British people
 Mixed (United Kingdom ethnicity category)
 British Indo-Caribbean people
 British African-Caribbean people
 Demographics of Grenada

References

External links 
 Famous Grenadians in the UK
 BBC born abroad, the Caribbean

 
Grenadian
Caribbean British
Ethnic groups in the United Kingdom
Grenadian diaspora